Roman Kienast (born 29 March 1984) is an Austrian professional footballer who plays as a striker for SC Lockenhaus-Rattersdorf. He is currently also the manager of First Vienna's U-18 squad.

Club career
Kienast joined the youth team of Rapid Wien at the age of 14. He debuted in the club's first team in 2002. In the next two seasons, he made 24 appearances in the Austrian Bundesliga, but was unable to score a goal. In 2004, he was loaned out to SC Rheindorf Altach, then playing in the Austrian Football First League (Austria's second highest professional league). After scoring four goals in six games, he was quickly called back by Rapid. During the rest of the season, he made 21 appearances for the Vienna side, and finally managed to score his first goal in the Bundesliga. The season ended in glory for the team as they won the Austrian title.

Just before the start of the 2006 season, Kienast came to the Norwegian club Hamarkameratene (Ham-Kam) on loan. He played well during the first spring games, and Ham-Kam decided to buy him. However, he could not prevent the team from going down that season. In the next season, Ham-Kam got promoted back to the Norwegian Premier League, with Kienast playing an integral part in the campaign by scoring 14 goals.

As of 27 May 2008, Kienast has not scored during the 2008 season in Ham-Kam's comeback to the top flight.

On 31 July 2008, Kienast moved to Helsingborgs IF of Allsvenskan in Sweden on loan for the rest of the year with an option for them to buy the player. On 26 November 2013, Kienast scored the first UEFA Champions League group stage goal in Austria Vienna's history, netting in the 1–1 away draw with FC Porto.

After three years with Austria Wien, he returned to Sturm Graz in January 2015.

Later career
In July 2019, Kienast joined SV Stripfing as a playing assistant manager. He left the club again in the summer 2020.

On 10 February 2021, Kienast joined SC Lockenhaus-Rattersdorf. Beside that, Kienast was also appointed manager of First Vienna FC's U-18 squad on 14 June 2021.

International career
Kienast made 11 appearances for the Austria national team. He scored one goal on 27 May in a 1–0 goal win Nigeria in a friendly. After that game, coach Josef Hickersberger chose him in the final squad for the European Championship.

Personal life
Roman is the son of former Rapid Wien player Wolfgang Kienast and the nephew of former Austria international Reinhard Kienast.

Honours
Rapid Wien
 Austrian Bundesliga: 2004–05

Sturm Graz
 Austrian Bundesliga: 2010–11

References

External links
 Player profile at Hamarkameratene's official web site (Norwegian)
 

1984 births
Living people
Footballers from Salzburg
Association football forwards
Austrian footballers
Austria international footballers
Hamarkameratene players
Helsingborgs IF players
SC Wiener Neustadt players
SK Rapid Wien players
SC Rheindorf Altach players
FK Austria Wien players
FC Wil players
SK Sturm Graz players
UEFA Euro 2008 players
Austrian Football Bundesliga players
2. Liga (Austria) players
Swiss Challenge League players
Allsvenskan players
Eliteserien players
Norwegian First Division players
Expatriate footballers in Norway
Austrian expatriate sportspeople in Norway
Expatriate footballers in Sweden
Austrian expatriate sportspeople in Sweden
Austria under-21 international footballers
Austrian expatriate sportspeople in Switzerland
Expatriate footballers in Switzerland
Austrian expatriate footballers